Shimmering, Warm and Bright is the third album by the Norwegian band Bel Canto.

Reception 

AllMusic awarded the album 4.5 stars.

Track listing
"Unicorn" (Drecker, Johansen) – 5:19
"Summer" (Drecker, Johansen) – 4:47
"Die Geschichte einer Mutter" (Drecker, Johansen) – 6:53
"Waking Will" (Drecker, Johansen) – 5:16
"Shimmering, Warm and Bright" (Drecker, Johansen) – 3:18
"Sleep in Deep" (Drecker, Johansen) – 2:58
"Buthania" (Drecker, Johansen) – 2:39
"Le Temps Dégagé" (Drecker, Johansen) – 4:43
"Spiderdust" (Drecker, Johansen) – 3:59
"Mornixuur" (Drecker, Johansen) – 7:49

Personnel 
 Anneli Marian Drecker – Vocals
 Nils Johansen – Programming
 Andreas Eriksen - Piano, percussion
 Luc van Lieshout – Trumpet, flugelhorn
 Ulf Holand - Engineer
 Rune Lindquist - Engineer
 Erik Avnskog - Engineer
 Nils Johansen and Anneli M. Drecker - Producers

References

External links 

 Anneli Drecker (of Bel Canto) - Shimmering, Warm & Bright (live) on YouTube

1992 albums
Bel Canto (band) albums
Crammed Discs albums
Columbia Records albums
Elektra Records albums